The Stal-5 (Stal – steel) was a transport aircraft designed in the USSR from 1933.

Development 
In 1933 Putilov started the design of a flying wing 18 passenger transport with the intention of achieving very high levels of efficiency. The broad rectangular centre section housed the cabin and a fully glazed cockpit on the centre line, with long and shallow fins at its extremities and a large elevator at the trailing edge. The tapered outer wings carried the slotted flaps and ailerons.
The structure was to be entirely formed from Enerzh-6 stainless steel tubing and rolled sections covered with bakelite-impregnated ply (similar to Delta-wood) on the centre section and fabric elsewhere.
Structural test specimens were tested, including a complete wing spar, and a 1/4 scale model powered by two  Salmson engines was built and flown by V.V. Karpov and Ya.G. Paul in 1935. The results of the scale model test flights were not encouraging, displaying poor handling and stability. After adjustments failed to yield better results further work was abandoned.

Variants 
 KhB - (Khimichyevskii Boyevik – chemical fighter) A chemical warfare variant was planned but was abandoned along with the Stal-5.

Specifications (Stal-5)

See also

References

 Gunston, Bill. “The Osprey Encyclopaedia of Russian Aircraft 1875–1995”. London, Osprey. 1995.

External links
 http://www.ussr-airspace.com/index.php?main_page=product_info&cPath=28_39_38_105&products_id=1031

1930s Soviet airliners
OOS aircraft
tailless aircraft
Aircraft first flown in 1935
Twin-engined tractor aircraft